Military Institute of Telecommunication and Information Technologies named after the Heroes of Kruty is an institution of higher military education in Ukraine and part of the State University of Telecommunications, located in Pechersk neighborhood of Kyiv. In the Soviet times (since 1965) it was known as the Kyiv Military Engineering College of Signal.

In 2001 – 2013 it was part of the Kyiv Polytechnic Institute. It is an important educational center for high-tech electronics and telecommunications and has a branch in Poltava.

Historical outlook

Kiev Military School
The institute is located in the same building as the original city's school of cantonists that was built in Kyiv in 1839. In 1865 on decree of the Russian Emperor Alexander II, the school was transformed into the Kiev Infantry Cadet School. In 1897 it was renamed again into the Kiev Military School and just before World War I into the 1st Kiev Military School.

In the fall of 1915 it was renamed into the 1st Kiev Konstantinovskoye Military School in the memory of past away Grand Duke Konstantin Konstantinovich of Russia. In November 1917 the school's students participated in extinguishing the Kiev Bolshevik Uprising as part of the city's garrison. In course of the event some 42 people of the school including staff and students died on the streets of Kyiv. After the power in the city transferred to the Central Council of Ukraine, some school personnel left the city for the Don Host Oblast and eventually with occupation of Ukraine by the Denikin's troops founded another school in Crimea in 1919, which was liquidated in 1920 by the Soviet regime.

First Military School of Khmelnytsky
In November 1917 the recently created 1st Ukrainian school of ensigns was transformed into the 1st Ukrainian Military School of Bohdan Khmelnytsky based on the former 1st Kiev Konstantinovskoye Military School. As the 1st Ukrainian Military School of Bohdan Khmelnytsky students under the command of Averkiy Honcharenko took part in the Battle of Kruty. Out of 200 students only 80 returned to Kyiv.

Soviet schools
After the defeat of Ukrainian forces, in 1920 in place of the former Konstantinovskoye school were quartered engineer classes that were created in Moscow back in 1919. On August 11, 1920, the Moscow Engineer classes were officially renamed into the 2nd Kiev Engineer classes. In 1921 the classes were renamed again into the 3rd Kiev Military Engineer School of Commanding staff. Once again the school changed its name in 1924 as the Kiev Military School of Communication and in 1926 was named in the memory of Mikhail Kalinin.

Kiev Military Radio-Technical Engineering College
The institute was founded back in Soviet times as "Kiev Higher Military Radio-Technical Engineering School" (abbreviated KVIRTU). This has also been referred to in Krasnaya Zvezda, via U.S. DOD documents, as the "Kiev Higher Engineering Radiotechnical School of Air Defence" of the Soviet Air Defence Forces.

The main compound of the institute was situated in Shevchenkivsky district of Kyiv (Melnikova str. 81). The compound was occupied by military education facilities as early as in late 19th century.

Notable graduates of the Institute
 Volodymyr Salsky, a Minister of Defense of Ukraine
 Anton Denikin, a leader of the Russian White movement
 Oleksiy Halkin, a Minister of Defense of Ukraine
Mykola Melnychenko, a communications protection agent for President Leonid Kuchma, notable figure of modern Ukrainian history
Oleksandr Tretiakov, Ukrainian businessman and politician, aide to President Viktor Yuschenko

List of battles
List of battles in which students of the institute or previous institutes took part.
 Kiev Bolshevik Uprising (1917) as the Kiev Konstantinovskoye Military School
 Battle of Kruty (1918) as the 1st Ukrainian military school of Bohdan Khmelnytsky

See also
 Aerorozvidka
 Military academy
 Military of Ukraine
 Signals (military)
 Soviet education

References

External links
 Official website
 Military Institute of Telecommunications and Information Technologies at the State University of Telecommunications website
 Barracks of Military Cantonists at the WEK encyclopedia.

Universities and colleges in Kyiv
Military education and training in the Soviet Union
Military education and training in Ukraine
Soviet Air Defence Forces
Information technology in Ukraine